Navarra was an  unprotected cruiser of the Spanish Navy in the late 19th century.

Technical characteristics
Navarra was built at Ferrol, Spain. In 1870, her design was changed to that of an unprotected cruiser or wooden corvette, and, after political events delayed her construction, she finally was launched in this form in 1881 and completed in 1882. Her original conception as an armored ship and the change to an unarmored one during construction left her with an overly heavy wooden hull that was obsolescent by the time of her launch.

Designed for colonial service, she had two funnels and was rigged as a barque. Her machinery was manufactured at the naval shipyard at Ferrol. The original main battery of Armstrong-built  guns was obsolescent when she was completed, and were quickly replaced with more modern Krupp-built guns, with the  guns mounted in sponsons.

Operational history

Navarra was commissioned in 1882. By the 1890s, she was assigned to the Cadiz Naval Group. Sources differ on her career after that; she either was hulked in 1896 and sold for scrap in 1899 or survived the 1890s to become a cadet training ship in 1900.

Notes

References
Chesneau, Roger, and Eugene M. Kolesnik, Eds. Conway's All The World's Fighting Ships 1860–1905. New York: Mayflower Books Inc., 1979. .
Nofi, Albert A. The Spanish–American War, 1898. Conshohocken, Pennsylvania: Combined Books, Inc., 1996. .

External links
The Spanish–American War Centennial Website: Castilla
The Spanish–American War Centennial Website: Spanish Wooden Cruisers
Department of the Navy: Naval Historical Center: Online Library of Selected Images: Spanish Navy Ships: Navarra (Cruiser, 1881–1899)

Aragon-class cruisers
Ships built in Spain
1881 ships
Spanish–American War cruisers of Spain